Collen Maine is a South African politician who was the president of the African National Congress (ANC) Youth League between 2015 and 2019. He was formerly a Member of the Executive Council and Member of the Provincial Legislature in North West province during the premiership of Thandi Modise and Supra Mahumapelo, and he has served in both houses of the national Parliament of South Africa. In December 2017, he was elected to a five-year term on the ANC's National Executive Committee.

Early career 
Mokone Collen Maine was born during apartheid, in 1980 or 1981, and is from the region that is now the North West province of South Africa. In his account, he was a member of the Congress of South African Students in his youth, joined the African National Congress (ANC) Youth League (ANCYL) in 1996, and served as a regional organiser for the ANC Youth League in Bophirima in the North West until he became deputy provincial chairperson of the league in the North West in 2008. The Daily Maverick reported that, according to the North West provincial leader of the rival Congress of the People (COPE), Maine was a member of COPE until 2009; Maine denied this. 

Pursuant to the 2009 general election, Maine was elected as a North West delegate to the National Council of Provinces, the upper house of the South African Parliament. In June 2013, he was appointed a Member of the Executive Council (MEC) in the provincial government of North West Premier Thandi Modise; his portfolio was social development and women, children and people with disability. In the next general election in 2014, he was elected as a Member of the North West Provincial Legislature. He was also appointed MEC for local government and human settlements under newly elected Premier Supra Mahumapelo. In addition, during this period he disclosed financial interests in several companies.

President of the ANC Youth League

Election 
By 2015, Maine was the provincial chairperson of the ANC Youth League in the North West, which supported his candidacy for the national presidency of the league. On 4 September 2015, at the league's 25th national elective conference in Midrand, he was elected unopposed as national president of the ANC Youth League, with Desmond Moela as his deputy. Pule Mabe, Ronald Lamola, and Lesego Makhubela were all viewed as Maine's competitors, but none made it to the final ballot; declining a nomination to stand for the deputy presidency, Lamola said that the electoral process was "a farce". Maine's candidacy was reportedly supported by the so-called Premier League, comprising the Premiers and ANC provincial chairpersons of the North West (Mahumapelo), Free State (Ace Magashule), and Mpumalanga (David Mabuza). Mahumpelo had reportedly supported Maine's rise through the North West Youth League in earlier years.

Maine's age attracted media interest, given the Youth League's rule that only persons under 35 were eligible for membership and leadership positions: he insisted that he was "34.5" at the time of the conference. His MEC position also attracted interest, since the Youth League presidency is typically a full-time job based out of Luthuli House, the ANC's headquarters in Johannesburg. After his election, Maine initially signalled his willingness to resign from the North West government, but in October he reversed his position; the league's newly elected provincial secretary, Njabulo Nzuza, said the Youth League's national executive committee had decided that the presidency would no longer be a full-time position and that Maine could hold retain his MEC post simultaneously. In early November 2015, however, Maine resigned from the Executive Council and was replaced by Wendy Nelson in an acting capacity; he did not publicly explain his reasons for resigning.

Support for Zuma and Dlamini-Zuma 
While Maine was Youth League president, he and the league under him became outspoken supporters of incumbent ANC president Jacob Zuma, then serving his second term as President of South Africa. For example, amid the Public Protector's investigation into allegations of state capture by Zuma's associates, Maine attended a "Hands Off Zuma" rally in Durban, where he urged veterans of the ANC's anti-apartheid armed wing, Umkhonto we Sizwe, to "bring your guns. Now is the time to defend the revolution". Maine also publicly supported some of Zuma's left-wing populist policy proposals, particularly free higher education and an assault on so-called "white monopoly capital". Ahead of the ANC's 54th National Conference, which would elect Zuma's successor as ANC president, the Youth League endorsed Zuma's favoured candidate, Nkosazana Dlamina-Zuma. Maine personally was a strong supporter of Dlamini-Zuma.

At the conference in December 2017, Dlamini-Zuma was beaten by Cyril Ramaphosa, who became national president in February 2018. Maine subsequently appeared to temper his pro-Zuma activism; he publicly pledged the league's loyalty to Ramaphosa as ANC president. In April 2018, the deputy secretary of the ANC Youth League, Thandi Moraka, told a gathering that Maine had approached Ramaphosa after the 54th National Conference to "apologise" on behalf of the Youth League for supporting Dlamini-Zuma. Moraka said of Maine that "he doesn't deserve to be called a comrade, because he is a sellout of note" and called for him to resign from the league.

National Assembly 
As president of the Youth League, Maine automatically became an ex officio member of the ANC National Executive Committee, the party's top decision-making body; at the 54th National Conference in December 2017, he was directly elected onto the committee for a five-year term, receiving the votes of 1,572 of the 4,283 delegates who submitted ballot papers. In the 2019 general election, in which the ANC renewed its majority, he was included on the party's electoral list and was elected to a seat in the National Assembly, the lower house of the national Parliament. He was sworn in on 22 May 2019 and became a member of the portfolio committee on public service and administration; despite speculation to the contrary, he was not appointed to Ramaphosa's cabinet.

On 5 July 2019, Maine announced that he would resign from his seat in the National Assembly due to "private matters". News24 reported that his resignation was effective immediately.

Succession 
The ANC Youth League failed to hold its elective conference in September 2018 as planned. In 2019, some members within the league, led especially by a group calling itself the Revive ANCYL Movement, began calling for the election of a new leadership corps, including by protesting outside an ANC National Executive Committee meeting and threatening a lawsuit. They argued both that many of the league's incumbent leaders were over the age of 35 and therefore ineligible to represent the ANC's youth and that they had overstayed their term (three years in terms of the league constitution).

In late July 2019, just weeks after Maine's resignation from Parliament, the ANC National Executive Committee disbanded the national executive of the Youth League, ending the terms of Maine and other league officials. Maine was nonetheless among the several former ANC Youth League presidents who were appointed as members of the interim task team that was installed to lead the province until it could hold fresh leadership elections.

Controversies

Relationship to the Gupta family 
Maine's defence of Zuma occasionally extended to a defence of Zuma's associates in the controversial Gupta family, who were alleged to be involved in state capture under Zuma's administration. In February 2016, for example, Maine was quoted as saying "an attack on the Guptas is an attack on the ANC". In May 2016, amaBhungane reported that there was evidence to "suggest" that Maine "received a generous helping hand from the Gupta family" through a loan which helped he and his wife to purchase a R5.4 million house on a golf estate outside Pretoria. They had bought the house in October 2015, weeks after Maine's election as ANC Youth League president. Dismissing allegations that he had personal ties to the Guptas, Maine said, "If engaging stakeholders is being captured, then I am captured... but mainly I am captured by the responsibility I was given by the ANCYL". He also clarified that in his defence of the Guptas, "I was dealing with those issues as a matter of principle, not that I have anything to do with them". In June 2017, amaBhungane further reported that the so-called Gupta Leaks suggested that Maine and other Youth League leaders had been assisted by Bell Pottinger, a public relations firm retained by a Gupta-owned company, in devising public remarks.

In April 2018, during a speech at a memorial service for ANC stalwart Winnie Madikizela-Mandela, Maine admitted that he had met the Guptas at their home. He said that he had not intended to go but had been "taken there", and that he had been taken not by Zuma but by Supra Mahumapelo. At the time Mahumapelo was confronting fierce opposition, in which Maine was thought to be involved, to his leadership of the North West. In connection with Maine's allegation, Mahumapelo said, "Reckless drivers who cause accidents on the roads must never blame the driving school for introducing them to driving". News24 described Maine's remarks as his "Damascus moment, turning against a man [Mahumapelo] who had long been seen as his political mentor".

Zondo Commission 
Investing allegations of state capture under Zuma's administration, the Zondo Commission found that Zuma supporters within the State Security Agency had set up a VIP protection unit in the agency's Special Operations division, technically usurping a function of the South African Police Service. The protection unit offered special protection to Zuma and various associates, including Maine.

Personal life 
He is married to Kelebogile Maine and as of 2015 had three children.

References

External links 

 
 

Living people
African National Congress politicians
People from North West (South African province)
Year of birth missing (living people)